Mölln is a municipality in the Mecklenburgische Seenplatte district, in Mecklenburg-Vorpommern, Germany. The first written mention of the village was in 1316.
On January 1, 1951, the previously independent communities were merged and now Mölln includes former municipalities of Buchholz, Groß Helle, Klein Helle, Lüdershof and Wrodow.

The Schloss Wrodow (Wrodow castle) is a major landmark of the Mölln municipality. Today it is used as an art gallery and a hotel.

References

External links

 Official website of Mölln at www.stavenhagen.de (German)

Municipalities in Mecklenburg-Western Pomerania
Mecklenburgische Seenplatte (district)